Jeremiah H. Service House, also known as Old Republic, is a historic home located at New Carlisle, St. Joseph County, Indiana.  It was built in 1860–1861, and is a two-story, square plan, Italianate style brick dwelling with additions.  It features a full-width front porch, paired scroll-sawn brackets, and a central cupola topped by Turkish-style onion dome.  Also on the property are the contributing ice house and smokehouse.

It was listed on the National Register of Historic Places in 2000.

References

Houses on the National Register of Historic Places in Indiana
Italianate architecture in Indiana
Houses completed in 1861
Houses in St. Joseph County, Indiana
National Register of Historic Places in St. Joseph County, Indiana